Zayin (also spelled zain or zayn or simply zay) is the seventh letter of the Semitic abjads, including Phoenician Zayin , Hebrew Zayin , Aramaic Zain , Syriac Zayn ܙ, and Arabic Zayn or Zāy . It represents the sound .

The Phoenician letter gave rise to the Greek zeta (Ζ), Etruscan z , Latin Z, and  Cyrillic Ze З.

Meaning
The Proto-Sinaitic glyph may have been called , based on a hieroglyph depicting a "manacle".

The Phoenician letter appears to be named after a sword or other weapon. In Mishnaic Hebrew,  means "sword", and the verb  means "to arm".

Arabic zāy 
The letter is named . It has two forms, depending on its position in the word:

The same letter has another name – že – in a number of languages, such as Persian, Pashto, Kurdish, Urdu and Uyghur (see K̡ona Yezik̡).

Hebrew zayin

In modern Hebrew, the frequency of the usage of zayin, out of all the letters, is 0.88%.

Hebrew spelling: 

In modern Hebrew, the combination  (zayin followed by a geresh) is used in loanwords and foreign names to denote  as in vion.

Significance

Numerical value (gematria)
In gematria, zayin represents the number seven, and when used at the beginning of Hebrew years it means 7000 (i.e.  in numbers would be the future date 7754).

Use in Torah scroll
Zayin, in addition to ʻayin, gimel, teth, nun, shin, and tzadi, is  one of the seven letters which receive a special crown (called a tagin) when written in a Sefer Torah (Torah scroll).

Meaning as a noun
For the Mishnaic and Modern Hebrew meaning of 'zayin' as a noun, see above.

It is one of several Hebrew letters that have an additional meaning as a noun. The others are: 
bet [, the 2nd letter], whose name is a grammatical form of the word for 'house'; 
vav [, the 6th letter], whose name means 'hook'; 
kaf [, the 11th], whose name means 'palm [of the hand]' or 'tablespoon'; 
ʻayin [, the 16th], whose name means 'eye'; 
pe [, the 17th], whose name means 'mouth'; 
qof [, the 19th], whose name means 'monkey' or "eye of needle"; 
tav [, the 22nd], whose name means 'mark', 
and several other Hebrew letters, whose names are ancient Hebrew forms of nouns still used, with a slight change of form or pronunciation, as nouns in modern Hebrew.

Syriac zain
Zain is a consonant with the  sound which is a voiced alveolar fricative.

Character encodings

See also 
ڤ - Ve
پ - Pe
گ - Gāf
چ - Che

References

Phoenician alphabet
Arabic letters
Hebrew letters